Charles Garrett Maloney (9 September 1913 – 30 April 2006) served as the auxiliary bishop of Louisville and titular bishop of Bardstown, Kentucky.

Education
Maloney attended high school and college at Saint Joseph's College in Rensselaer, Indiana where he graduated summa cum laude.  He later attended the Pontifical North American College in Rome, Italy where he was eventually ordained.

Ministry
Maloney was ordained a priest in 1937.  On 30 December 1954 Pope Pius XII appointed Maloney the auxiliary bishop of the Roman Catholic Archdiocese of Louisville; he served in the capacity for 51 years.  He was consecrated as a Roman Catholic bishop in 1955 by Archbishop John Alexander Floersh at the Cathedral of the Assumption in Louisville, Kentucky.   Also in 1954, he was appointed bishop of the titular see of Capsa.  Later he was appointed as the first titular bishop of the diocese of Bardstown, Kentucky, a diocese founded in 1808 but later moved to Louisville.

Second Vatican Council
As of 1995, His Excellency was one of only eight United States bishops still living who participated in the Second Vatican Council.  Maloney participated in all four session of the council from 1962 to 1965.  He was influential in the passage of Dignitatis humanae (Declaration on Religious Freedom), one of only sixteen documents generated by the Council and approved by the Pope.  Ironically, Bishop Maloney often said the traditional Latin Mass during his retirement at Saint Martin of Tours Church in Louisville.

See also

Basilica of Saint Joseph Proto-Cathedral
Cathedral of the Assumption (Louisville)
Capsa (see)

References
Bishop Maloney had active role in defense of religious freedom
Archdiocese of Louisville Homepage - Bishop Maloney Dies
Catholic Bishop Maloney dies at 93
Episcopal Lineage
Obituaries in the news - Bishop Maloney Dies

External links
Cathedral of the Assumption Homepage
Basilica of St. Joseph Proto-Cathedral Homepage
Roman Catholic Archdiocese of Louisville Homepage

Episcopal succession

Religious leaders from Louisville, Kentucky
20th-century American Roman Catholic titular bishops
21st-century American Roman Catholic titular bishops
Participants in the Second Vatican Council
Saint Joseph's College (Indiana) alumni
1913 births
2006 deaths
Catholics from Kentucky